Dream Thief may refer to:
"Dream Thief", a song by Phinehas from the 2021 album The Fire Itself
The Dream Thief, a series of novels by Wim Gijsen
Iskander the Dream Thief, the first installment in the series
The Dream Thief, an album featuring jazz band leader Shai Maestro
The Dream Thief: An Extraordinary Horatio Lyle Mystery, a novel by Catherine Webb
The Dream Thief, a theatrical play by Robert Schenkkan
Abadazad: The Dream Thief, a novel by J. M. DeMatteis
"The Dream Thief", an episode of Hello Kitty and Friends
"Beheeyem, Duosion, and the Dream Thief!", an episode of Pokémon the Series: Black & White